Christian Donald Laettner (born August 17, 1969) is an American former professional basketball player. His college career for the Duke Blue Devils is widely regarded as one of the best in National Collegiate Athletic Association (NCAA) history. He was the star player on the back-to-back Duke National Championship teams of 1991 and 1992, and the NCAA player of the year in his senior year. He is particularly famous for his game-winning shot against Kentucky in the 1992 tournament and for the hatred he received from opposing fans.
 
Laettner was the only collegian selected for the 1992 United States men's Olympic basketball team, dubbed the "Dream Team", that won the gold medal at the 1992 Summer Olympics. As a member of the "Dream Team", Laettner is enshrined in the Naismith Memorial Basketball Hall of Fame, U.S. Olympic Hall of Fame, and FIBA Hall of Fame, while he is enshrined for his individual career in the College Basketball Hall of Fame. He was drafted third overall by the Minnesota Timberwolves, then played 13 seasons in the National Basketball Association (NBA) for six teams, being named as an All-Star in 1997.

Early life
Christian Laettner was born and raised in Angola, New York (near Buffalo and Niagara Falls) to a blue-collar Roman Catholic family. His father George, a newspaper press plant printer, was of Polish descent and his grandparents spoke Polish as their first language; his mother Bonnie was a teacher. Christian's older brother Christopher was a strong influence, often bullying young Christian, which helped instill a stern competitive drive. Both boys also frequently worked as farm laborers to supplement their allowance.

Laettner attended the private Nichols School; although he received a financial aid package that paid a substantial part of his tuition, his family had to sacrifice to send him there, and he also did janitorial work at the school to defray some of the cost. During his career he scored over 2,000 points, breaking the school record set by teammate Ron Torgalski, and the team won two state titles and reached another semifinal. He was a much sought-after college recruit.

College

Laettner attended Duke University and played for the basketball team from 1988 to 1992 under coach Mike Krzyzewski. As the team's star player his final two seasons, he led the Blue Devils to the first two national titles in school history. A four-year starter, he also contributed to their runner-up finish his sophomore year and Final Four appearance in his freshman year. Thus, in total, he played 23 out of a maximum possible 24 NCAA tournament games, winning 21; both are records.

For his career, Laettner averaged 16.6 points and 7.8 rebounds per game while making almost half of his three-pointers. He scored 21.5 points per game his senior season, garnering every major national player of the year award; Duke retired his No. 32 jersey later that year. His career is widely regarded as among the best in college history, and he is enshrined in the National Collegiate Basketball Hall of Fame.

NCAA tournament records
Most points scored: 407
Most free throws made: 142
Most free throw attempts: 167
Most games won: 21
Most games played: 23

Clutch performances
Laettner had several clutch performances in the NCAA tournament. His most famous was the 1992 regional final against Kentucky, which was foreshadowed by the 1990 regional final against UConn; in both games Duke trailed by one point with two seconds remaining in overtime before Laettner made a jumper as time expired. He also swished the game-winning free throws against undefeated and heavily favored UNLV in the 1991 semifinal, which avenged UNLV's 30-point victory in the 1990 final. He then led Duke to its first championship, defeating Kansas in the final, and was selected as the tournament's most outstanding player.

In the 1992 East Regional Final, a game many critics rate among the greatest in college basketball history, Laettner hit a game-winning, buzzer-beating turn-around jumper that has since become known as simply The Shot. Over the course of the game, he shot a perfect ten of ten field goals and ten of ten free throws for 31 points. He then finished his college career by leading Duke to its second consecutive national title. The following year ESPN awarded him both "Outstanding Performance Under Pressure" and "College Basketball Play of the Year" for the Kentucky game, also awarding him "Outstanding College Basketball Performer of the Year".

The game-winning shot against Kentucky became a cultural icon, having been frequently televised in college basketball montages. Several companies have also featured it in their commercials. In 2006 The Best Damn Sports Show Period ranked it the fifth most memorable moment in sports history.

Widely reviled
Laettner was widely reviled by opposing fans throughout his career, to the extent that more than 20 years after graduating from Duke, he was voted the most hated college basketball player in history in an ESPN online poll. This led to ESPN's creation of the 30 for 30 documentary I Hate Christian Laettner that explored five factors which the filmmakers believe explain this widespread and persistent hatred: race, privilege, bullying, greatness, and physical appearance. He was particularly resented for stepping on the chest of Kentucky player Aminu Timberlake during the 1992 regional final, which the referees deemed a technical foul; Laettner expressed regret for his misconduct but believed that ejection would have been too harsh a consequence.

Professional career
Drafted third overall by the Minnesota Timberwolves, Laettner played 13 years in the NBA, from 1992 to 2005, scoring 11,121 points and grabbing 5,806 rebounds. His first six seasons were his best, averaging 16.6 points and 7.9 rebounds per game while starting almost all of them. He also was selected to the All-Rookie First Team in 1993 and the All-Star Game in 1997 while with the Atlanta Hawks. His time on the Hawks was his most successful NBA team experience, twice reaching the second round of the playoffs.

Despite his achievements, Laettner's NBA career was characterized by relative transience. He played for six different teams, was traded six times, and never spent more than three full seasons anywhere. In 2004, he was suspended for several games for using marijuana.

National team career
As the national player of the year, Laettner was the only collegian selected for the prestigious "Dream Team" that won the 1992 Olympic gold medal in a dominant fashion. He averaged 4.8 points per game. The team is considered one of the greatest in sports history and was inducted into the U.S. Olympic Hall of Fame, FIBA Hall of Fame, and the Naismith Memorial Basketball Hall of Fame.

Post-NBA basketball
Laettner maintains a close friendship with Duke teammate Brian Davis. They have pursued several business ventures together, including real-estate development in Durham, a Major League Soccer team, and an unsuccessful attempt to purchase the Memphis Grizzlies. Some legal problems, primarily regarding unpaid debts, have also occurred. In 2010, Laettner was enshrined in the Naismith Memorial Basketball Hall of Fame as a member of the 1992 Dream Team.

Since 2011 he has operated numerous youth basketball training camps. He also played one season in a semi-pro league and briefly served as an assistant coach in the NBA Development League. For The Z Team, an Olympic Channel reality show that has former Olympic athletes help struggling sports teams, he worked with the Garinger High School boys basketball team for a week.

Personal life
Laettner lives in Ponte Vedra Beach, Florida, and is an avid muskellunge fisherman.

He is divorced with three children.

He has donated large sums to his alma maters.

Career statistics

NBA

Regular season

|-
| style="text-align:left;"|
| style="text-align:left;"|Minnesota
| 81 || 81 || 34.9 || .474 || .100 || .835 || 8.7 || 2.8 || 1.3 || 1.0 || 18.2
|-
| style="text-align:left;"|
| style="text-align:left;"|Minnesota
| 70 || 67 || 34.7 || .448 || .240 || .783 || 8.6 || 4.4 || 1.2 || 1.2 || 16.8
|-
| style="text-align:left;"|
| style="text-align:left;"|Minnesota
| 81 || 80 || 34.2 || .489 || .325 || .818 || 7.6 || 2.9 || 1.2 || 1.1 || 16.3
|-
| style="text-align:left;"|
| style="text-align:left;"|Minnesota
| 44 || 44 || 34.5 || .486 || .290 || .816 || 6.9 || 2.9 || .9 || 1.0 || 18.0
|-
| style="text-align:left;"|
| style="text-align:left;"|Atlanta
| 30 || 27 || 32.6 || .489 || .000 || .823 || 7.9 || 2.3 || 1.0 || .9 || 14.2
|-
| style="text-align:left;"|
| style="text-align:left;"|Atlanta
| 82 || 82 || 38.3 || .486 || .352 || .816 || 8.8 || 2.7 || 1.2 || .8 || 18.1
|-
| style="text-align:left;"|
| style="text-align:left;"|Atlanta
| 74 || 49 || 30.8 || .485 || .222 || .864 || 6.6 || 2.6 || 1.0 || 1.0 || 13.8
|-
| style="text-align:left;"|
| style="text-align:left;"|Detroit
| 16 || 0 || 21.1 || .358 || .333 || .772 || 3.4 || 1.5 || .9 || .8 || 7.6
|-
| style="text-align:left;"|
| style="text-align:left;"|Detroit
| 82 || 82 || 29.8 || .473 || .292 || .812 || 6.7 || 2.3 || 1.0 || .5 || 12.2
|-
| style="text-align:left;"|
| style="text-align:left;"|Dallas
| 53 || 35 || 17.5 || .511 || .333 || .817 || 4.0 || 1.3 || .8 || .5 || 7.5
|-
| style="text-align:left;"|
| style="text-align:left;"|Washington
| 25 || 13 || 29.3 || .491 || .300 || .844 || 6.1 || 2.3 || 1.2 || .8 || 13.2
|-
| style="text-align:left;"|
| style="text-align:left;"|Washington
| 57 || 48 || 25.3 || .464 || .200 || .868 || 5.3 || 2.6 || 1.1 || .4 || 7.1
|-
| style="text-align:left;"|
| style="text-align:left;"|Washington
| 76 || 66 || 29.1 || .494 || .125 || .833 || 6.6 || 3.1 || 1.1 || .5 || 8.3
|-
| style="text-align:left;"|
| style="text-align:left;"|Washington
| 48 || 18 || 20.5 || .465 || .286 || .800 || 4.8 || 1.9 || .8 || .6 || 5.9
|-
| style="text-align:left;"|
| style="text-align:left;"|Miami
| 49 || 0 || 15.1 || .582 || .143 || .763 || 2.7 || .8 || .7 || .3 || 5.3
|- class="sortbottom"
| style="text-align:center;" colspan="2"|Career
| 868 || 692 || 29.7 || .480 || .261 || .820 || 6.7 || 2.6 || 1.1 || .8 || 12.8
|- class="sortbottom"
| style="text-align:center;" colspan="2"|All-Star
| 1 || 0 || 24.0 || .600 ||  || 1.000 || 11.0 || 2.0 || 1.0 || 1.0 || 7.0

Playoffs

|-
| style="text-align:left;"|1996
| style="text-align:left;”|Atlanta
| 10 || 10 || 33.4 || .484 || .333 || .704 || 6.9 ||1.5 || 1.2 || 1.0 || 15.7
|-
| style="text-align:left;"|1997
| style="text-align:left;”|Atlanta
| 10 || 10 || 40.3 || .418 || .190 || .857 || 7.2 || 2.6 || 1.0 || .8 || 17.6|-
| style="text-align:left;"|1998
| style="text-align:left;”|Atlanta
| 4 || 0 || 21.8 || .343 || .000 || .882 || 4.3 || 1.0 || 1.5 || .3 || 9.8
|-
| style="text-align:left;"|1999
| style="text-align:left;”|Detroit
| 5 || 0 || 24.6 || .426 ||  || .786 || 2.8 || 2.2 || .8 || .2 || 10.2
|-
| style="text-align:left;"|2000
| style="text-align:left;”|Detroit
| 3 || 3 || 25.0 || .412 ||  || .750 || 5.0 || 2.0 || .0 || .3 || 6.7
|-
| style="text-align:left;"|2005
| style="text-align:left;”|Miami
| 13 || 0 || 10.5 || .500''' || .000 || .833 || 1.9 || .5 || .3 || .0 || 2.2
|- class="sortbottom"
| style="text-align:center;" colspan="2"|Career
| 45 || 23 || 25.7 || .432 || .179 || .794 || 4.7 || 1.5 || .8 || .5 || 10.5

College

|-
| style="text-align:left;"|1988–89
| style="text-align:left;"|Duke
| 36 || 16 || 16.9 || .723 || 1.000 || .727 || 4.7 || 1.2 || 1.0 || .8 || 8.9
|-
| style="text-align:left;"|1989–90
| style="text-align:left;"|Duke
| 38 || 38 || 29.9 || .511 || .500 || .836 || 9.6 || 2.2 || 1.6 || 1.1 || 16.3
|-
| style="text-align:left;"|1990–91
| style="text-align:left;"|Duke
| 39 || 39 || 30.2 || .575 || .340 || .802 || 8.7 || 1.9 || 1.9 || 1.1 || 19.8
|-
| style="text-align:left;"|1991–92
| style="text-align:left;"|Duke
| 35 || 35 || 32.2 || .575 || .557 || .815 || 7.9 || 2.0 || 2.1 || .9 || 21.5
|- class="sortbottom"
| style="text-align:center;" colspan="2"|Career
| 148 || 128 || 27.4 || .574 || .485 || .806 || 7.8 || 1.8 || 1.6 || 1.0 || 16.6

Awards and honors
NBA
 NBA All-Star
 NBA All-Rookie First Team
USA Basketball
 Summer Olympics gold medal winner (1992)
 Pan American Games bronze medal winner (1991)
 FIBA World Championship bronze medal winner (1990)
 Tournament of the Americas gold medal winner (1992)
 Tournament of the Americas silver medal winner (1989)
 Goodwill Games silver medal winner (1990)
NCAA
 2× NCAA champion (1991, 1992)
 NCAA Final Four Most Outstanding Player (1991)
 Consensus National College Player of the Year (1992)
 Consensus first-team All-American (1992)
 Consensus second-team All-American (1991)
 2× NCAA final Four All-Tournament Team) (1991, 1992)
 ACC Player of the Year (1992)
 ACC Player of the Year (1992)
 2× ACC Athlete of the Year (1991, 1992)
 2× First-team All-ACC (1991, 1992)
 Second-team All-ACC (1990)
 ACC tournament MVP 1992
 Oscar Robertson Trophy (1992)
 NABC Player of the Year (1992)
 NABC Player of the Year (1992)
 John R. Wooden Award (1992)
 Naismith College Player of the Year (1992)
 No. 32 jersey retired by Duke in 1992
Media
 Sporting News College Player of the Year (1992)
 AP College Basketball Player of the Year (1992)
Halls of Fame
 Naismith Memorial Basketball Hall of Fame (class of 2010 as a member of the "Dream Team")
 U.S. Olympic Hall of Fame (class of 2009 as a member of the "Dream Team")
 FIBA Hall of Fame (class of 2017 as a member of the "Dream Team")
 College Basketball Hall of Fame (class of 2010)
 National Polish-American Sports Hall of Fame (class of 2008)

See also

 List of NCAA Division I men's basketball players with 2,000 points and 1,000 rebounds
 List of NCAA Division I men's basketball career games played leaders
 List of NCAA Division I men's basketball career free throw scoring leaders

Notes

References

External links

1969 births
Living people
1990 FIBA World Championship players
All-American college men's basketball players
American men's basketball players
American people of Polish descent
American soccer chairmen and investors
American sportspeople in doping cases
Atlanta Hawks players
Basketball players at the 1991 Pan American Games
Basketball players at the 1992 Summer Olympics
Basketball players from New York (state)
Catholics from New York (state)
Centers (basketball)
Competitors at the 1990 Goodwill Games
Dallas Mavericks players
Detroit Pistons players
Doping cases in basketball
Duke Blue Devils men's basketball players
Fort Wayne Mad Ants coaches
Goodwill Games medalists in basketball
McDonald's High School All-Americans
Medalists at the 1991 Pan American Games
Medalists at the 1992 Summer Olympics
Miami Heat players
Minnesota Timberwolves draft picks
Minnesota Timberwolves players
National Basketball Association All-Stars
National Collegiate Basketball Hall of Fame inductees
Olympic gold medalists for the United States in basketball
Pan American Games bronze medalists for the United States
Pan American Games medalists in basketball
Parade High School All-Americans (boys' basketball)
People from Angola, New York
Power forwards (basketball)
Sportspeople from Erie County, New York
United States men's national basketball team players
Washington Wizards players